Jabal Aja Protected Area is a protected area in northern Saudi Arabia. It consists of a red granite mountain range projecting from a flatter area and is of importance for both plant and animal life. Jabal Aja has been designated an Important Plant Area and an Important Bird and Biodiversity Area.

Geography
This falls mainly in winter, mostly from storms approaching from the southwest, and frost is not unusual. Jabal Aja is situated to the west and southwest of the town of Ha'il and the protected area has been extended to the northeast to include an area of arid flattish terrain with low sandstone hills and granite outcrops extending to the edge of the An Nafud desert.

Flora and fauna
Jabal Aja has been designated an Important Plant Area because of the richness of its plant life and the presence of many endemic and relict plant species. The reserve offers a refuge to plants from the Mediterranean and Irano-Turanian Regions in an area that otherwise forms part of the Saharo-Arabian Region. About 355 species of plant have been recorded in the reserve, including the plants found in the adjoining desert area of An Nafud.

The plains have deep sandy-loam soils and the dominant plant is Haloxylon salicornicum, with the desert gourd being common and Asphodelus tenuifolius occurring in depressions. The annual plants Stipa tortilis, Picris cyanocarpa and Anthemis appear after rains. On the thin slopes below the rocks, Acacia gerrardii is dominant and is accompanied by other woody shrubs such as Searsia, Periploca, Gymnocarpos and Ephedra foliata. In the wadis and runnels, more Acacia gerrardi grows, associated with Lycium shawii, Pulicaria undulata, Ochradenus baccatus and Zilla spinosa.

The combined area of Jabal Aja and Northern Ha'il has been designated an Important Bird and Biodiversity Area because of its importance as a centre for migratory birds especially the demoiselle crane (Grus virgo). Among the important species resident in the reserve are the sand partridge, griffon vulture, Egyptian vulture, desert owl and pale rockfinch. Among the migratory species that visit the reserve in passage or over-winter here are Menetries's warbler, white-throated robin, Finsch's wheatear, cinereous bunting and several species of cranes.

Mammals found in the park include the grey wolf, sand cat and Nubian ibex, and there are a number of species of reptile and amphibian.

In 1973, the country's last known cheetahs were reported in the vicinity of Ha'il.

See also
 Ha'il Region
 Salma Mountains

References

Protected areas of Saudi Arabia